Boșorod is a commune in Hunedoara County, Transylvania, Romania. It is composed of nine villages: Alun, Bobaia (Bobája), Boșorod, Chitid (Kitid), Cioclovina (Csoklovina), Luncani (Lunkány), Prihodiște (Prihodest), Târsa and Ursici.

Piatra Roșie Dacian fortress is located near the Luncani village.

References

Communes in Hunedoara County
Localities in Transylvania